Məşədivəlilər (also, Məşədivəllər, Meshadivelilar, and Meshedi-Veliler) is a village in the Tovuz Rayon of Azerbaijan.  The village forms part of the municipality of Həsənli.

References 

Populated places in Tovuz District